The 2012–2013 Israel Football League was the sixth season of the Israel Football League (IFL). The league expanded to 11 teams as the Rehovot Silverbacks became the newest expansion franchise.  The Tel Aviv-Jaffa Sabres became the first team in IFL history to go undefeated throughout the regular season and postseason and the season concluded with the Sabres defeating the Judean Rebels in Israel Bowl VI.

Regular season 
The regular season consisted of 10 games for each team and the division format was left behind in favor of a schedule in which every team played every other team once.

Playoffs 
The wild card round saw both underdog teams come out victorious, including the Kings' Hail Mary pass to beat the Hammers. In the semifinals, the Sabres crushed the Kings and the Rebels upset the Pioneers in 100+ degree heat.

Wild Card games 

 Hammers 46 – 50 Kings

 Lions 42 – 50 Rebels

Semi-finals 

 Pioneers 34 – 38  Rebels

 Sabres 60 – 6 Kings

Israel Bowl VI 
The Sabres and Rebels went toe-to-toe in Israel Bowl VI, but the Sabres pulled away midway through the third quarter, and held on for their second straight title.

 Sabres 48 - 26 Rebels

Awards 

 Most Valuable Player: Dani Eastman, WR/DB/RS/QB, Judean Rebels
 Offensive Player-of-the-Year: Adi Hakami, QB, Tel Aviv/Jaffa Sabres
 Defensive Player-of-the-Year: Gilad Shoham, DE, Ramat Hasharon Hammers
 Special Team Player-of-the-Year: Liran Zamir, K/P, Judean Rebels
 Coaching Staff-of-the-Year: Ramat Hasharon Hammers
 Offensive Rookie-of-the-Year: Jordan Curran, QB, Ramat Hasharon Hammers
 Defensive Rookie-of-the-Year: Mor Kalomiti, DB, Petah Tikva Troopers

References

Israel Football League Seasons